Teresa Ramos Selma Monte (born August 13, 1930 in Puerto Píritu) is a Venezuelan actress. She has played roles in film, theater, television and dubbing.

Career 

Selma's most recent work includes performances in theatrical productions such as: El último verano de Sarah Bernhardt (2011), Arráncame la vida (2013) and Yo soy Carlos Marx (2014).

Recognition 
In 2015, Selma was honoured for having a career spanning 65 years at the World Season of Performing Arts Quetzalcoatl by Isabel Quintanar, president of the Mexican Center of the International Theatre Institute (ITI).

Filmography

Films

References

External links

1930 births
Venezuelan voice actresses
Venezuelan stage actresses
Mexican stage actresses
Venezuelan psychiatrists
Naturalized citizens of Mexico
Venezuelan emigrants to Mexico
Living people
Place of birth missing (living people)
Venezuelan women psychiatrists